1 Vicarage Road is a Grade II listed building in the English market town of Poulton-le-Fylde, Lancashire. Built in 1839, it stands at the corner of Vicarage Road and Breck Road, directly across the latter from the Thatched House public house. Now an estate agent, the building was originally Poulton Savings Bank. It was the town's library in the 1880s.

It is symmetrical, constructed of brick with stone dressings and a concrete tile roof. The front entrance is a stone doorway with a depressed-arch head and a radiating fanlight. The building is of two storeys. At the front there are two sash windows on the ground floor and three on the first, each with a stone windowsill and hood mould. There are a further two windows on each end. The right gable (looking from the front) has a stone plaque which is inscribed with "Poulton Savings Bank 1839".

See also
Listed buildings in Poulton-le-Fylde

References

Sources

External links
A view of the building across Breck Road from the Thatched House public house – Google Street View, April 2019

Buildings and structures in Poulton-le-Fylde
1839 establishments in England
Commercial buildings completed in 1839
Grade II listed buildings in Lancashire